The Sky's Gone Out is the third studio album by English gothic rock band Bauhaus, released in 1982 by record label Beggars Banquet.

Music
NME said about the music: "[singer] Peter Murphy comes across like David Bowie imitating Jacques Brel declaiming a pastiche of Lautréamont backed by the early [Siouxsie and the] Banshees.

Release
The Sky's Gone Out was released in October 1982 by the record label Beggars Banquet. It featured a cover version of Brian Eno's "Third Uncle", a new recording of "Spirit", and experiments with ballads, disco, ska and reggae.

The initial limited edition included the live album Press the Eject and Give Me the Tape as a bonus. The compact disc reissue dropped the run-out speech from the final track "Exquisite Corpse" (which, like the snoring on the song itself, was done by the band's sound engineer Derek Tompkins). The Canadian edition of this album also contained a free 12" vinyl single featuring "Ziggy Stardust", "Kick in the Eye" and "Lagartija Nick". This version did not have the distinctive artwork from the USA and UK editions but was presented as a white field with the album title and band logo in the upper right corner.

Reception 

In his retrospective review of the album, Ned Raggett of AllMusic wrote, "On balance it's quite a fine album, but unlike Mask it misses the infusion of a more positive energy, and simply doesn't gel as perfectly, more notable for individual songs than as a whole."

Legacy 

In their feature on the album in 2001 Alternative Press described The Sky's Gone Out as one of the Top 10 essential goth albums.

Track listing

Personnel 
 Bauhaus

 Peter Murphy – vocals, additional guitar
 Daniel Ash – guitars, vocal on Exquisite Corpse, album cover painting
 David J – bass guitar, vocal on Exquisite Corpse
 Kevin Haskins – drums, congas on "Third Uncle"

References

External links 

 

1982 albums
Bauhaus (band) albums
Beggars Banquet Records albums
Albums recorded at Rockfield Studios